In computer science, protection mechanisms are built into a computer architecture to support the enforcement of security policies. A simple definition of a security policy is "to set who may use what information in a computer system".

The access matrix model, first introduced in 1971, is a generalized description of operating system protection mechanisms.

The separation of protection and security is a special case of the separation of mechanism and policy.

Notes

References
Anita K. Jones, Richard J. Lipton The enforcement of security policies for computation ACM Symposium on Operating Systems Principles. Proceedings of the fifth ACM symposium on Operating systems principles. Austin, Texas, United States. pp. 197–206. 1975

Carl E. Landwehr Formal Models for Computer Security  Volume 13,  Issue 3  (September 1981) pp. 247–278
  

Computer security models
Computer security procedures